Biblical Egypt (Mīṣrāyīm), or Mizraim, is a theological term used by historians and scholars to differentiate between Ancient Egypt as it is portrayed in Judeo-Christian texts and what is known about the region based on archaeological evidence. Along with Canaan, Egypt is one of the most commonly mentioned locations in the Bible, and its people, the Egyptians (or Mitsri), play important roles in the story of the Israelites. Although interaction between Egypt and nearby Semitic-speaking peoples is attested in archaeological sources, they do not otherwise corroborate the biblical account.

The Book of Genesis and Book of Exodus describe a period of Hebrew slavery in Egypt, from their settlement in the Land of Goshen until their escape and the journey through the wilderness to Sinai. Based on the internal chronology of the Hebrew Bible, this would correspond roughly to the New Kingdom of Egypt during the Late Bronze Age.

In the Bible, a  number of Jews took refuge in Egypt after the destruction of the Kingdom of Judah in 597 BC, and the subsequent assassination of the Jewish governor, Gedaliah (2 Kings , Book of Jeremiah ). On hearing of the appointment, the Jewish population fled to Moab, Ammon, Edom and in other countries returned to Judah. In Egypt, they settled in Migdol, Tahpanhes, Noph, and Pathros (Jeremiah 44:1).

Portrayal

In the Book of Genesis 
In the Book of Genesis, Abraham and Sarah, along with their nephew Lot, were living in Canaan when a famine struck the area and so, the group travels to Egypt, where the Pharaoh, betaken by Sarah's beauty, made her his concubine, unaware that she is married because Abraham introduces himself as her brother, not her husband. Pharaoh gives number of gifts to Abraham in exchange for Sarah, in the form of livestock and slaves, one of whom is Hagar, who would later become Abraham's concubine and the mother of his firstborn son, Ishmael. For how long Sarah lives in Pharaoh's palace is not clear, though it is known that the  strikes Pharaoh and members of his household, save for Sarah, with plague, and Pharaoh deduces that Sarah is somehow the cause. Once learning that Sarah is Abraham's wife, not only his sister, he releases her to him and does not ask that Abraham return to him any of the livestock or slaves, and they leave Egypt without interruption, with significant wealth.
Later in the Book of Genesis is the story of Abraham and Sarah's great-grandson, Joseph, the eleventh son of Jacob and his first son with his second wife, Rachel. It is said that Jacob prefers Joseph over all of his other sons, causing tension between Joseph and his brothers, and so, they sell him into slavery, to a group of traveling Midianites headed for Egypt, where he's purchased by Potiphar, the captain of the guard. Joseph does well as a member of Potiphar's household, highly respected by his master, until Potipher's wife, scorned by Joseph, falsely accuses him of attempting to rape her and Joseph is imprisoned as a result. During his imprisonment, Joseph successfully interprets the dreams of two fellow prisoners, both servants of Pharaoh, one of whom is sentenced to death and the other who returns to Pharaoh's graces. Joseph begs of Pharaoh's cup-bearer, the prisoner who returns to Pharaoh's graces, to tell Pharaoh of him but he doesn't for some time, not until Pharaoh is troubled by dreams as the cup-bearer once was. Joseph reveals to Pharaoh that his dreams are signs of a great famine to come, and for his service, Pharaoh makes Joseph the vizier of Egypt and gives to him an Egyptian wife, Asenath. When famine strikes much of the region, not only Egypt, the Egyptians are so well prepared for it that they have a surplus of grain, which foreigners come to buy, among them, Joseph's brothers, who do not recognize him. Later, Joseph calls for all of Jacob's household, numbering seventy individuals, to come and live in Egypt with him, in the land of Goshen.

In the Book of Exodus 
In the Book of Exodus, the Israelites, descendants of Joseph and his brothers, are still living in the land of Goshen, and are now slaves, beaten, raped, and overworked by the Egyptian overlords under the reign of a new, tyrannical pharaoh. A great-great-grandson of Joseph's brother Levi, Moses, is born in a time when Pharaoh has decreed all newborn Hebrew males be slain and he is saved from Pharaoh's orders by Pharaoh's daughter, who rescues him from the Nile River and raises him as her own son. There, with his brother, Aaron, and sister, Miriam, Moses demands the release of his people but Pharaoh refuses and for his stubbornness, he and his people suffer the Plagues of Egypt, famine, insect swarms, and notably, the deaths of all the firstborn Egyptians.

In the Books of Kings 
In the Books of Kings, Solomon, the king of Israel and the son of David, is said to have married Pharaoh's daughter, whose name is not provided, and received the city of Gezer as part of her dowry. Nothing else is written as to the personal nature of Pharaoh's daughter or about her relationship with Solomon. However, their relationship, and Solomon's willingness to take wives from other nations, in violation of laws against intermarriage in the Book of Deuteronomy, is thought to have contributed to his downfall. Solomon is said to have obliged his foreign wives and built temples for their gods in the land of Israel, and after his death at age sixty, relatively young for a biblical character, the tribes of Israel would not accept his heir, Rehoboam, son of the Ammonite woman Naamah, as ruler and so, the united monarchy of Israel failed.
Also in the Books of Kings is the story of Jeroboam, a former servant of Solomon who later conspired against him and, when his plotting was revealed, fled to Egypt, where Pharaoh Shishak protected him until Solomon's death. Though he is not identified in the Hebrew Bible, in the Septuagint, Jeroboam is said to have married a close female relative of Shishak, named Ano, who was the older sister of Tahpenes.

In the Books of Chronicles 
In the Books of Chronicles, Rehoboam, son of Solomon and the first king of Judah, is attacked in the fifth year of his reign by an Egyptian pharaoh, whose personal name is given as Shishak, whom some historians have identified with Shoshenq I. It written that Rehoboam may have expected an attack, as he fortified fifteen major cities, among them Bethlehem and Hebron, but his efforts were not enough, as Shishak came with 1,200 chariots and 60,000 soldiers, not only Egyptians but also Lubims, Sukkites, and Kushites. As a result of his defeat, Judah became a vassal state, subordinate to Egypt. The Israelites humble themselves and the  prevents further destruction of their people but still orders that the Israelites become servants of Shishak.

In the Gospel of Matthew 
In the Gospel of Matthew, part of the New Testament, it is said in Matthew 2:13-23 that Joseph, the earthly father of Jesus of Nazareth, is visited by an angel in a dream, who tells him to take Mary and Jesus and go to Egypt, to avoid Jesus being slain by King Herod I, called the Flight into Egypt. After Herod's death, they return to Nazareth.

Notable Egyptians in the Bible 
 Asenath, the wife of Joseph
 Bithiah, the adoptive mother of Moses
 The Egyptian, a Jewish eschatological prophet
 Hagar, the second wife of Abraham, former servant to Sarah, and mother of Ishmael
 Pharaoh's daughter, a wife of Solomon
 Potiphar, the master of Joseph
 Potiphar's wife, named Zulaikha in extrabiblical sources
 Potipherah, the father of Asenath, the wife of Joseph and mother of Manasseh and Ephraim
 Shishak, a pharaoh of Egypt

See also
 History of the Jews in Egypt
 Joseph (Genesis)
 Merneptah Stele
 Pharaohs in the Bible
 Plagues of Egypt
 Babylonian captivity

References

Further reading

 C. A. Redmount in Coogan (ed.), The Oxford History of the Biblical World, Oxford University Press, 2001, 58–89.
 Joseph Modrzejewski, The Jews of Egypt: From Rameses II to Emperor Hadrian, Jewish Publication Society, 1995
 Franz V. Greifenhagen, Egypt on the Pentateuch's Ideological Map: Constructing Biblical Israel's Identity, Bloomsbury Publishing, 2003
 S. C. Russell, Images of Egypt in Early Biblical Literature: Cisjordan-Israelite, Transjordan-Israelite, and Judahite Portrayals, New York University. Hebrew and Judaic Studies,  ProQuest, 2008